Thomas Livingston McCreery (October 19, 1874 – July 3, 1941) was an outfielder and pitcher in Major League Baseball.  He played for the Louisville Colonels (1895–1897), New York Giants (1897–1898), Pittsburgh Pirates (1898–1900), Brooklyn Superbas (1901–1903) and Boston Beaneaters (1903). McCreery was a switch hitter and threw right-handed.  
 
McCreery was born in Beaver, Pennsylvania, and debuted with the Louisville Colonels in 1895, primarily as a starting pitcher, and posted a 3–1 record with a shutout. In 1896 McCreery switched to outfield, and he responded with a .351 batting average, 65 runs batted in, 91 runs, 26 stolen bases, a .546 slugging percentage, and led the National League with 21 triples.

In 1897, McCreery posted career-highs in runs (91), stolen bases (28), RBI (67), games played (138), and hit .289. On July 12, he hit three inside-the-park home runs, becoming the only player in major league history to hit three inside-homers in a single game. He also played in part of seven seasons with the New York Giants, Pittsburgh Pirates and Brooklyn Superbas, hitting .323 for Pittsburgh in 1899. He played his final major league game with the Boston Beaneaters in 1903.

In a nine-season career, McCreery was a .289 hitter with 27 home runs and 388 RBI in 802 games.

An alumnus of Georgetown University, McCreery served as the head coach of the University of Pittsburgh's baseball team in 1912. McCreery died in Beaver, Pennsylvania, at the age of 66.

See also

 List of Major League Baseball annual triples leaders

References

External links
Baseball Almanac
Baseball Reference

1874 births
1941 deaths
People from Beaver, Pennsylvania
Boston Beaneaters players
Brooklyn Superbas players
Louisville Colonels players
New York Giants (NL) players
Pittsburgh Pirates players
Major League Baseball outfielders
Major League Baseball pitchers
19th-century baseball players
Baseball players from Pennsylvania
Georgetown University alumni
Pittsburgh Panthers baseball coaches
Norfolk Clam Eaters players
Norfolk Clams players
Norfolk Crows players
Nashville Seraphs players
Minneapolis Millers (baseball) players
Indianapolis Indians players
Columbus Senators players